Kahan-e Pain (also Romanized as Kāhān-e Pā’īn; also known as Kāhān-e Soflá) is a village in Meshkan Rural District, Meshkan District, Khoshab County, Razavi Khorasan Province, Iran. At the 2006 census, its population was 81, in 20 families.

References 

Populated places in Khoshab County